Faces Down is the first album released by Norwegian singer-songwriter Sondre Lerche, in 2001. It was released in 2002 in the United States, and in 2003 in Japan. All songs on the album were written by Lerche.

The track "Modern Nature" featured prominently in the 2007 film Dan in Real Life, starring Steve Carell and Juliette Binoche; Lerche and his band The Faces Down make a cameo appearance in the movie performing the track.

Track listing

"Don't Be Shallow" (Japanese edition bonus track)

References

External links
Faces Down on Sondre Lerche's website

2001 debut albums
Sondre Lerche albums